Sultan Raisovich Aksanov (born 19 August 1993) is a Russian professional football player who plays as a midfielder.

Club career
Aksanov made his professional debut for FC Tom Tomsk on 23 April 2013 in a game against FC SKA-Energiya Khabarovsk.

External links
 

1993 births
Sportspeople from Tomsk
Living people
Russian footballers
Association football midfielders
FC Tom Tomsk players
Sevan FC players
Russian First League players
Russian Second League players
Armenian First League players
Russian expatriate footballers
Expatriate footballers in Armenia
Russian expatriate sportspeople in Armenia